Kasur District (Punjabi), is a district located in Lahore Division of Punjab, Pakistan. It came into existence on 1 July 1976. Prior to its creation, it was a tehsil of the Lahore District.

The district capital is Kasur city, the birth city of the Sufi poet Bulleh Shah, who is well known in that region as well as in the whole of Pakistan. The total area of the district is 4,796 square kilometres.

History
In ancient time, Kasur was known for its education and fish. The history of Kasur is more than 1,000 years. Kasur region was agricultural region with forests during the Indus Valley civilization. The Vedic period is characterized by Indo-Aryan culture that migrated from Central Asia and settled in Punjab region. The Kambojas, Daradas, Kaikayas, Pauravas, Yaudheyas, Malavas and Kurus migrated, settled and ruled ancient Punjab region. After overrunning the Achaemenid Empire in 331 BCE, Alexander marched into present-day Punjab region with an army of 50,000. The Kasur region was ruled by Maurya Empire, Indo-Greek kingdom, Kushan Empire, Gupta Empire, White Huns, Kushano-Hephthalites and the Turk and Hindu Shahi kingdoms.

In 997 CE, Sultan Mahmud Ghaznavi, took over the Ghaznavid dynasty empire established by his father, Sultan Sebuktegin, In 1005 he conquered the Shahis in Kabul in 1005, and followed it by the conquests of Punjab region. The Delhi Sultanate and later Mughal Empire ruled the region. The Punjab region became predominantly Muslim due to missionary Sufi saints whose dargahs dot the landscape of the Punjab region.

The Mughal Empire ruled Kasur for 200 years. After and during the decline of the Mughal Empire, the Sikhs took over the Kasur District. The agriculture lands were given to leaders and supporters of the Sikh army. Most of the Punjab region was annexed by the East India Company in 1849, and was one of the last areas of the South Asia to fall under British colonial rule. During the British Raj, the irrigation canals were built that irrigated large areas barren lands of the Kasur District.

The predominantly Muslim population supported Muslim League and Pakistan Movement. After the independence of Pakistan in 1947, the minority Sikhs and Hindus migrated to India while the Muslim refugees from India settled in the Kasur District.

Demography 
At the time of the 2017 census, the district's population was 3,454,881, of which 1,788,617 were males and 1,666,044 females. 2,564,101 were rural and 890,780 urban. The literacy rate was 60.77%. Muslims were the predominant religious community with 96.48% of the population while Christians were 3.47% of the population.

At the time of the 2017 census, 89.86% of the population spoke Punjabi and 1.80% Urdu as their first language. 7.80% of the population recorded their language as 'Others' on the census.

Development 

The Bambawali-Ravi-Bedian Canal was built in Kasur district increasing the agricultural development of the area. There has been commercial and industrial development but the area remain mainly agricultural. Pakistan Army built Cantonment area for an infantry brigade in the district.

Administrative divisions
The district is administratively subdivided into 4 Tehsils spanning a territory of 13 divisions and 125 Union Councils: the total area of Kasur is 3995 km2.

Physical features
The district is bounded by the Ravi River in the north-west and river Sutlej in the south-east. Whereas the old course of Beas River bifurcates the district into two equal parts locally known as Hither and Uthar or Mithan Majh. Both of the areas have a height differential of approximately 5.5 meters. The natural surface elevation of the district is 198 meters above the sea level, having a general slope from north-east to south- west. Whereas the east and west ends of the district comprise the flood plains of the rivers Satluj and Ravi, characterized by breaching of looping river Channels braided around meander bars. Kasur district is attached with Lahore from east, attached with Nankana Sahib from north, attached with Faisalabad from west and attached with Okara and India from south.

Topography
Topographically speaking, Kasur District lies between the river Satluj which flows along its boundaries with India and river Ravi which flows its boundary with Nankana Sahib District. The districts may be divided into two parts, a low lying or riverine area along the two bordering rivers and upland, away from the rivers. The riverine area is generally inundates during monsoon season. The water level in this area is higher than in the upland. The soil is sandy. The upland is flat plains sloping from north-west to south-west. The general height of the area is from 150 to 200 meters above the sea level.

Flora
Flora of the district has been greatly modified by human agency of the old open forests of small trees and shrubs; there remains only a few Rakhs or portions of forest which are kept as gazing ground for cattle etc. Amongst trees the most important are Kikar (Acacia arabica), Shisham or Tahli (Dalbergia sissoo), Beri (Zizyphus jajaba), Toot (Morus marlaccae), Sharin (Albizzia lebbek), Dharek (Malia azerdaracb), Phulahi (Acacia modesta), and Nim (Melia indica), Piple (Ficus indica) are planted for shade. The growth in Rakhs is composed mainly of three kinds of trees Jand (Prosopis spicigera), Karril (Capparis aphylla), and van or Jal (Salvadora obeoides). Occasionally pelu (acacia Loucophhloea) and Farash (Tamarix articulate) are also found. Pilchi (Tamarix gallio) is found on moist sandy soil along the rivers and is used for wicker-work, basket making etc.

Fauna
Wolf and jackal are the only wild animals of any importance. The former being met with occasionally in the low land wastes of Chunian Tehsil but jackal are found every where. Changa Manga reserve a thick forest is the only area in which a few Nelgai, pig, peafowl and here are found.

Places of interest

Kasur famous for Kasuri methi, Kasuri fish, and Kasuri andarsay. The city is also the resting place of Sufi poet Bulleh Shah. Other places of interest include:
Baba Ram Thaman Shrine, Hindu temple famous for annual Vaisaki fair
Baloki is famous for the Ravi River. Many of the people visit this village. Balloki Power Plant is also situated in Baloki.
Phool Nagar industrial area
 Pattoki is the 7th dense industrial area of Pakistan
 Chunian is famous for its sugar mills. Abdullah Sugar Mill is the largest sugar mill of Pakistan
 Kot Radha Kishan is famous for being related to lord Krishna and his beloved Radha (of Hinduism) 
 Changa Manga, the largest forest of Pakistan

 Shrine of Baba Bulleh Shah, Kasur City
 Ganda Singh Wala Border, Pakistan-India Border
 Balloki Headworks & many resorts
 Changa Manga Forest, near Chunian Town

 Shrine of Atta Ullah Vato Khuveshgi Alias Peer Bolna Sarkar
 Shrine of Baba Sadar Dwan
 Kasur Museum
 Tomb of Baba Kamal Cishti
 Shrine of Abdullah Shah Bukhari (Baba Sha Jhanda), near Pattoki city in the village also named after him
 Gurdwara Hardo Sahari and Samadh Pir Sahari Chhina Jatt. Village Hardo Sahari

Qadiwind is a historically significant to the Sikh religion. After the independence in 1947, the Sikhs there emigrated to East Punjab in India. Punjabi writer Baba Sohan Singh Sital was a resident of this village. His house and garden area was allotted to Muslim refugees from Mewat who came as part of independence. The majority population consists of Meo or Mewatis who migrated to 1947.

Notable people 
 

 Tahir Aslam Gora, Pakistan-Canadian writer, broadcaster and translator.
 Noor Jehan, playback singer and actress 
 Ahmad Raza Khan Kasuri, former MNA.
 Khurshid Mahmud Kasuri, former Foreign Minister and now member of PTI
 Malik Meraj Khalid, Speaker of the National Assembly twice, and Prime Minister of Pakistan in 1997.
 Bade Ghulam Ali Khan, Indian classical vocalist.
 Barkat Ali Khan, classical vocalist.
 Rana Muhammad Iqbal Khan, Pakistani politician who was the Speaker of the Provincial Assembly of the Punjab from 2008 to May 2018. Now MPA.
 Sardar Muhammad Arif Nakai, ex-Chief Minister of Punjab, Pakistan.
 Bebe Nanaki, sister of Guru Nanak
 Moeenuddin Ahmad Qureshi, ex-vice-President of World Bank and Prime Minister of Pakistan in 1993.

References 

 
Districts of Punjab, Pakistan